"Steppin Up" is a song by British recording artist M.I.A. from her third studio album, Maya (2010). The track was written by Maya "M.I.A." Arulpragasam, Rusko and Switch, and produced by Rusko. The song was self-released worldwide as a digital download, under license to XL Recordings and N.E.E.T. Recordings, on 16 June 2010, as the third single from the album. A different version of the song later appeared on the Vicki Leekx mixtape under a slightly altered title. The song was performed during the Maya Tour in 2010 and 2011. No music video has been made for the single. The track received mixed to positive reviews from music critics.

Track listing
Digital download
 "Steppin Up" – 4:01

12" vinyl single
A. "Steppin Up"
B. "Meds and Feds"

Charts

Release history

References

2010 singles
2010 songs
Electronic songs
M.I.A. (rapper) songs
Songs written by M.I.A. (rapper)
XL Recordings singles
Songs written by Switch (songwriter)